Department S is a British spy-fi adventure series, produced by ITC Entertainment. It consists of 28 episodes which originally aired in 1969 and 1970. It stars Peter Wyngarde as author Jason King (later featured in spin-off series Jason King), Joel Fabiani as Stewart Sullivan, and Rosemary Nicols as computer expert Annabelle Hurst. These three are agents for a fictional special department (the "S" of the title) of Interpol. The head of Department S is Sir Curtis Seretse (Dennis Alaba Peters).

Production
"When a case proves too baffling for the minds of Interpol, they turn to the talents of Department S." – from the ITC trailer for the series.

The series was created by Dennis Spooner and Monty Berman, although neither wrote any of the episodes, which were instead scripted by ITC regulars such as Terry Nation and Philip Broadley. Many of the directors on the show had also worked on other ITC shows such as The Saint, Danger Man and Randall and Hopkirk (Deceased).

The series was shot on 35mm film and designed, like all ITC's film productions, to fit the United States commercial format. Although episodes begin with a cold open (after the 'S' logo is shown), unusually, the episode title, writer and director credits appear on screen before the opening title sequence, though after the theme tune has started. With a few exceptions, the principal cast is always studio-bound. Some exteriors are represented by studio buildings, while the rest are mainly shown in second-unit footage using doubles where necessary. Outside locations were, in common with similar series, largely restricted to the Hertfordshire countryside in the vicinity of Borehamwood. At least one foreign location was used, featuring Peter Wyngarde on the streets of Vienna. Otherwise, foreign locations are usually established by the use of stock footage. To further cut costs, the series was produced back-to-back with Randall and Hopkirk (Deceased).

Synopsis
Department S is a division of Interpol headed by international bureaucrat Sir Curtis Seretse (Dennis Alaba Peters). Its headquarters is in Paris and its members investigate international cases that other crime agencies cannot solve.

The team itself is led by American and former FBI agent Stewart Sullivan (Joel Fabiani), who takes direction from Seretse. Outside of his FBI experience, little is known about Sullivan except that he is pragmatic and hands-on, and does much of the leg-work, confronting the criminals.

Jason King (Peter Wyngarde) is the ideas man, but also helps in the field. He is an adventure novelist who uses details from their cases to write his novels. The living he makes writing novels affords him a hedonistic lifestyle, and he is often seen with beautiful women though he has no permanent love interest in the series; in one episode he mentions he is a widower whose wife was killed in a plane crash. King also serves as comic relief in the series, especially in scenes of hand-to-hand combat where he winds up being subdued as often as he prevails.

Annabelle Hurst (Rosemary Nicols) is a computer expert and analyst as well as a field investigator. A very attractive woman, Hurst sometimes appears in seductive, glamorous disguises, as well as her underwear in the first episode. There are ongoing hints of romantic interest between Sullivan and Hurst during the series.

Cast
Peter Wyngarde as Jason King
Joel Fabiani as Stewart Sullivan
Rosemary Nicols as Annabelle Hurst
Dennis Alaba Peters as Sir Curtis Seretse

Episodes
Filming took place between April 1968 and June 1969.

The air dates are for ATV Midlands. ITV regions varied date and order.

The production numbers here refer to ITC synopsis guide numbers and the sequence in the Network DVD booklet.

Re-runs 
A repeat run of Department S began on ITV4 in November 2005, alongside others of a large number of similar ITC productions.
Episodes of Department S screened on London Live TV channel in the London area in March–April 2022.

Home media
The first two episodes of Department S were released on DVD in Britain by Carlton Television (now part of ITV plc). Department S was released on DVD in Australia by Umbrella Entertainment in a box set. This version is in PAL with no region code. Network released the series on DVD in the United Kingdom  featuring many exclusive extras, including commentaries and part of a documentary series also covering Jason King: Wanna Watch a Television Series? Chapter One: Variations on a Theme.

Department S first appeared in high definition on Blu-ray as a single episode on Retro Action Volume 1 released by the Network imprint on 19 September 2011. This contained the episode "A Small War of Nerves", which features Anthony Hopkins.

Volume-by-volume release of the entire series in new high-definition transfers on Blu-ray began in 2017, with the first available on 27 February. There are six volumes in total; the first two each contain four episodes, the next four contain five episodes each.

A complete box set of the entire series was released in Blu-ray on 2 October 2017, coded for all three regions.

See also 
 Grim's Dyke – house & filming location

References

External links

British Film Institute Screen Online

1969 British television series debuts
1970 British television series endings
1960s British drama television series
1970s British drama television series
Television shows shot at Associated British Studios
Espionage television series
Television series by ITC Entertainment
ITV mystery shows
British science fiction television shows
British detective television series
Television series by ITV Studios
Television shows set in England
Fictional intelligence agencies